Haytham or Haitham (Arabic: هيثم, Hebrew: הייתם, Syriac/Assyrian-Aramaic: ܗܝܬܡ pronounced: hay-tham) is a male Semitic given name with Arabic origins meaning "young eagle" or "young hawk". It is highly popular among Middle Eastern communities including Arabs, Jews, Assyrians, Kurds, Copts, and Berbers. The name is used by Muslims, Jews and Christians alike.  

Notable people with this name include:

 Ibn al-Haytham, Arab Muslim polymath
 Haitham Ahmed Zaki (born 1984), Egyptian actor
 Haithem Al-Matroushi (born 1988), Emirati footballer
 Haithem Ben Alayech (born 1989), Tunisian wrestler
 Haitham El Hossainy (born 1977), Egyptian judoka
 Haitham Kadhim, Iraqi footballer
 Haithem Mahmoud (born 1991), Egyptian wrestler 
 Haitham Mrabet (born 1980), Tunisian footballer 
 Haitham Mustafa, Sudanese footballer
 Haitham Yousif, Assyrian singer
 Haitham Zein, Lebanese footballer
 Haytham Faour, Lebanese footballer
 Haytham Kenway, character in the Assassin's Creed video game franchise
 Haytham Tambal, Sudanese football striker
 Malik ibn al-Haytham al-Khuza'i, Khurasani missionary leader
 Haitham bin Tariq, present Sultan of Oman

References

Arabic masculine given names